James "Jim" Gerald (1 January 1891 – 2 March 1971) also known as James Gerald Diabolo was an Australian comedian, circus clown, acrobat, writer, director and troupe leader and filmmaker. He is generally regarded as one of the four leading post-World War I comedians to work the Australasian variety circuits, the others being Nat Phillips, Roy Rene, and George Wallace.

Biography
Born at Darlington, New South Wales, Gerald was the seventh son of Stephen Australia Fitzgerald, a tailor turned actor, and his wife Mary Ann, née Ingram. In his youth Jim played truant from school to watch acrobats practising on the sandhills behind Centennial Park, learned to tumble and haunted his uncles' circus. Three of his brothers also went on the stage using the names 'Max Clifton', 'Lance Vane' and 'Cliff Stevens'. In 1898 his father apprenticed him to Oscar Pagel's Circus. He subsequently travelled the world, including South Africa, Africa, the Far East and North America for around ten years.

Back in Australia by c.1907–1908, Gerald found employment with several circuses; and as 'Diabolo' was billed as the first man to loop the loop on a motorcycle. In 1910 he and two of his brothers, Lance Vane and Max Clifton, appeared in The Life and Adventures of John Vane, the Notorious Australian Bushranger. That film, also directed by his father, is now viewed as a significant landmark in the history of Australian cinema, being the first recorded involvement in narrative film production by Charles Cozens Spencer (a leading figure in the early Australian film industry).

Gerald's "move into variety entertainment began in 1912 when he toured with his father's All Stars drama and vaudeville company as both comedian and acrobat. Although he soon afterwards signed with Sir Benjaman Fullers, Fullers' Theatres vaudeville circuit]]. Gerald was immediately leased to Stanley McKay for his touring pantomime company, and over the next five to six years appeared throughout Australia and New Zealand as a specialist pantomime dame Within a year of joining McKay's company Gerald married Esther Patience Futcher, a 27-year-old actress known by stage name Essie Jennings (1886-1969). The ceremony took place on 21 July 1913 at St Peter's Anglican Church, Wellington, New Zealand,. The two latter formed a highly popular knockabout comedy sketch act, appearing in sketches such as "The Actress and the Paperhanger" and "The new Recruit."

Fitzgerald enlisted in the Australian Imperial Force on 5 May 1916 and served in Mesopotamia as a driver with the 1st Australian and New Zealand Wireless Signal Squadron. Discharged on 12 October 1918, he returned to the Fullers' circuit and was soon asked by (Sir) Benjamin Fuller to write and produce his own revue sketches. He had seen the funny side of soldiering in Mesopotamia and his act, 'The New Recruit', remained popular for years. Unlike his contemporaries Roy Rene and George Wallace, Gerald was 'unashamedly international' in his work. Almost every Christmas he played the dame in pantomimes. He made some thirty silent films in the United States of America in 1928, and was influenced by Sir Charlie Chaplin whom he greatly admired.

When the Fullers folded in 1933, Gerald continued to play six-month seasons in Sydney and Melbourne under various managements. In 1935-36 he appeared in several revues at the Garrick Theatre, including Don't Spare the Horses. Returning to Sydney, in May 1936 he featured in Shout for Joy. One critic wrote that he 'cannot particularly sing nor does he know much about dancing, but he is undoubtedly a master of patter, of quick, well-timed delivery and retort'. Gerald signed a contract with the Australian Broadcasting Commission in February 1939; he starred in 'Jim and Jitters' with Jim Davidson's A.B.C. Dance Band and conducted the Saturday 'After-Dinner Show'. Next year he formed his own radio-production company.

On 10 April 1941 Gerald was appointed honorary lieutenant colonel in the A.I.F. Placed in charge of the Entertainment Unit, he embarked for the Middle East on 1 September in the Queen Elizabeth. A shrewd organizer and an experienced producer, he gathered Davidson and his band, comedians, singers, jugglers, acrobats and trick cyclists, as well as backstage technicians, 'among them costume designers, seamstresses and electricians'. At his headquarters at Tel Aviv, Palestine, he recruited a female chorus line. The first performance at Gaza of All in Fun was 'received with rapturous applause'.

Home again in October 1942, Gerald transferred to the retired list on 31 December. He joined the Tivoli circuit and appeared in the revue, Stripped for Action (1943). In 1951 he played the happy roué in Ladies' Night in a Turkish Bath. He shared top billing with Wallace in Thanks for the Memory, at AusStage: Gateway to the Performing Arts. (sighted 19 January 2014)</ref> at the Princess Theatre, Melbourne, in 1953 and toured for three years in that revue. He was 'as uproariously funny as ever though not as spry' in The Good Old Days (Sydney, 1957). Next year he retired to St Kilda, Melbourne. Gerald enjoyed watching any kind of sport, but his passion was for motoring: he owned a succession of cars which he drove across America, through Europe, the Middle East and Britain, and all over Australia. After Essie's death in 1969, he moved into a home at Rosebud. He died there on 2 March 1971 and was cremated. 'Jim Gerald was probably best remembered for his versatility—as a big-eared oaf in baggy pants and shapeless hat, as a seemingly rubber-boned and pathetically droll clown and as Australia's greatest pantomime dame.'

Notes
 A number of secondary sources (including an earlier version of this Wikipedia entry) have incorrectly claimed that Jim Gerald was a nephew to Dan and Tom Fitzgerald (Fitzgerald Brother's Circus) and their younger brother John Daniel Fitzgerald (1862-1922), a prominent Sydney barrister, social reformer and Labor parliamentarian. In her 1996 entry on Gerald for the Australian Dictionary of Biography, Martha Rutledge writes, for example, that he was a "nephew of J. D. Fitzgerald,' and that he 'haunted his uncle's circus.' In this respect she is possibly referencing and expanding on Charles Norman's comment in When Vaudeville Was King (1983). On page 224 Norman writes: 'Jim Gerald came from a circus family. Some of his uncles were the top names of the day.'  Robert Colomb, retired Reader in Information Systems, School of Information Technology and Electrical Engineering (University of Queensland) has discovered through extensive historical and genealogical research that the two Fitzgerald families were unrelated. In correspondence with the Australian Variety Theatre Archive (April 2013) he draws attention to Stephen Australia Fitzgerald's father, Stephen Fitzgerald, having been born in Clifton, Gloucester (England) in 1820. Columbs' evidence is given further credibility through Bede Nairn's biography of John 'Jack' Fitzgerald (Australian Dictionary of Biography). In this entry she records that he and his older brothers Dan and Tom were the sons of schoolteacher John Daniel Fitzgerald and his wife Mary Ann, née Cullen, both from Limerick, Ireland. Dan and Tom were born in New Zealand in the late 1850s, while "Jack" was born in Shell Harbour, New South Wales in 1862. There is no reference to S.A. Fitzgerald because he came from an entirely different Fitzgerald family
 The Companion to Theatre in Australia (1995) claims that Gerald began his career in variety with Harry Clay (p. 243). However, extensive research into Clay's operations by his great-great-great nephew, Clay Djubal, has failed to find any evidence of Gerald ever having working for the Sydney-based showman. Gerald's statement in a 1928 Everyone's interview that he "started with the Fullers and planned to finish with them" (22 February 1928, p. 46), puts further doubt on the Harry Clay claim.

References

External links
"Jim Gerald" at Australian Variety Theatre Archive (sighted 19 January 2014)
"Jim Gerald" at AustLit: The Australian Literature Resource (subscription service)
"Jim Gerald Revue Co" at Australian Variety Theatre Archive (sighted 19 January 2014)

1891 births
1971 deaths
Australian male comedians
20th-century Australian comedians
Comedians from Sydney
Australian clowns
Australian military personnel of World War I
Military personnel from New South Wales
Male actors from Sydney
Australian male stage actors